The Georgia State Panthers football statistical leaders are individual statistical leaders of the Georgia State Panthers football program in various categories, including passing, rushing, receiving, total offense, defensive stats, and kicking. Within those areas, the lists identify single-game, single-season, and career leaders. The Panthers represent Georgia State University in the NCAA's Sun Belt Conference.

Georgia State began competing in intercollegiate football in 2010. Therefore, complete box scores for all games are readily available and the Panthers don't have an era of incomplete statistics. These lists are updated through the end of the 2016 season.

Passing

Passing yards

Passing touchdowns

Rushing

Rushing yards

Rushing touchdowns

Receiving

Receptions

Receiving yards

Receiving touchdowns

Total offense
Total offense is the sum of passing and rushing statistics. It does not include receiving or returns.

Total offense yards

Total touchdowns

Defense

Interceptions

Tackles

Sacks

Kicking

Field goals made

Field goal percentage

References

Georgia State
statistical leaders